Craven Park may refer to:

 Craven Park (Barrow), home of Barrow (rugby league)
 Craven Park, Hull, current home of Hull Kingston Rovers (rugby league)
 Old Craven Park, former home of Hull Kingston Rovers (rugby league)
 Craven Park (London), area of North London